The Principal's Office is a reality TV program on TruTV that began airing on August 21, 2008, released through Leftfield Pictures.  New episodes resumed on January 8, 2009. However, the series was abruptly cancelled on February 5, 2009.

Synopsis
It is set in various American high schools and features dramatic and humorous encounters between students and principals. Some events that lead to such encounters are students being late to class, truancy, food fights, smoking, swearing, harassment, cheating on exams, use of cell phone, dress code in school, disrespecting teachers and other students, fighting or skateboarding/scootering in hallways, vandalizing school property, theft, insubordination and disruptive conduct in class.

Other media appearances
 Some clips of The Principal's Office were aired on E!'s The Soup.

Related shows
The World's Strictest Parents
Beyond Scared Straight
Teen Trouble
Sleeping with the Family

External links
The Principal's Office on truTV

2008 American television series debuts
2009 American television series endings
2000s American high school television series
2000s American reality television series
2000s American documentary television series
Television series about teenagers
TruTV original programming